Uncarina is a genus of plant in the family Pedaliaceae found in Madagascar.

Etymology
The genera name is derived from the Greek word unca meaning hook.

Species

Species include:

References

External links
 Uncarina on PlantSystematics.org
 Descriptive Catalogue, (Pandanaceae - Zamiaceae) – includes Uncarina of family Pedaliaceae

Lamiales genera
Pedaliaceae